The  is a multi-purpose dam on the Hienuki River, a branch of the Kitakami River, located in the city of Hanamaki, Iwate Prefecture in the Tōhoku region of northern  Japan. It managed by Hanamaki Civil Engineering Center, Minami Kunisaki Promotion Department, and is a gravity-type concrete dam with a bank height of 73.5 meters.

History
Hayachine Dam is one a series of five multipurpose dams built directly on the Kitakami River and its major tributaries, starting with the Tase Dam in 1941. The dam was intended to provide industrial and drinking water for the growing city of Hanamaki, as well as irrigation water, flood control and hydroelectric power. The dam was completed by the Kajima Corporation in 2000.

Design
The Hayachine Dam is a concrete gravity arch dam. The associated hydroelectric power plant has an installed capacity of 3000 KW.

References
Japan Commission on Large Dams. Dams in Japan: Past, Present and Future. CRC Press (2009). 
 photo page with data (
Iwate Prefectural home page 
Kajima Corporation Home page 

Dams in Iwate Prefecture
Dams completed in 2000
Hydroelectric power stations in Japan
Gravity dams
Hanamaki, Iwate